Clare Greet (14 June 1871 – 14 February 1939) was an English stage and film actress. She began on stage in Shakespeare with the Ben Greet Company. She appeared in 26 films between 1921 and 1939, including seven films directed by (and one produced by) Alfred Hitchcock. She was born in Leicestershire and died in London.

Partial filmography

 The Rotters (1921) as Mrs. Clugson
 Love at the Wheel (1921) as Martha
 Three Live Ghosts (1922) as Mrs. Gubbins
 Number 13 (1922) as Mrs. Peabody
 The Farmer from Texas (1925) as Frau Appelboom
 The Ring (1927) as Fortune Teller (uncredited)
 The Rising Generation (1928) as Cook
 The Manxman (1929) as Mrs. Cregeen
 Murder! (1930) as Member of the Jury
 Third Time Lucky (1931) as Mrs. Scratton
 Alibi (1931)
 Many Waters (1931) as Registry Office Cleaner (uncredited)
 Lord Babs (1932) as Mrs. Parker
 The Sign of Four (1932) as Mrs. Hudson (uncredited)
 White Face (1932) as Mrs. Albert
 Lord Camber's Ladies (1932) as Peach
 Channel Crossing (1933) as Anxious Passenger
 Mrs. Dane's Defence (1933) as Mrs. Bulsom-Porter
 The Pointing Finger (1933) as Landlady
 Little Friend (1934) as Mrs. Parry
 The Man Who Knew Too Much (1934) as Mrs. Brockett (uncredited)
 Emil and the Detectives (1935) as Grandma
 Maria Marten (1936) as Mrs. Marten
 Royal Eagle (1936)
 Sabotage (1936) as Mrs. Jones, Cook (uncredited)
 St. Martin's Lane (1938) as Old Maud
 Jamaica Inn (1939) as Granny Tremarney, Sir Humphrey's Tenant

References

External links

1871 births
1939 deaths
English stage actresses
English film actresses
English silent film actresses
Actresses from Leicestershire
20th-century English actresses